Thyrsanthella is a genus of flowering plants belonging to the family Apocynaceae.

Its native range is Central and Eastern USA.

Species:
 Thyrsanthella difformis (Walter) Pichon

References

Apocynoideae
Apocynaceae genera